Tornado Zadar is a supporter group from Zadar, Croatia. The official name of this civil association is in Croatian Udruga navijača Tornado Zadar, which translated means Civil association of the supporters Tornado Zadar. 
The association is registered with the Croatian NGO register under the number 13000768.

History

Tornado Zadar has been organized since 1965. and is a second oldest supporters association in Croatia after Torcida Split with whom they are friends. The sixties and seventies were the golden age for the association, after which the enthusiasm of the members were slowly declining, the culmination of which happened in 1999, when the core of the association members retired, leaving the association for good.

The 2002 was essential for the association because the young generation of the supporters started to regroup and to refurbish the association. Today the association is living its golden times. They are very well organized and well known, again.

In the game season 1997/98 Tornado Zadar was selected for the best fan club in Croatia.

Activities

Association Tornado Zadar mostly supports basketball club KK Zadar, but also football club NK Zadar as well as other sport teams from Zadar. It is accustomed that any match of the KK Zadar is followed by a group of Tornado supporters. They don't have exact rivalry (although some see Šibenski funcuti group from Šibenik as their rivals) but they are with odds mostly with clubs from Zagreb, or internationally from Serbia and their respective ultras. 
Throughout the era of former Yugoslavia the tensions were high on matches with KK Crvena Zvezda.

In 2009. a book titled "Posljednja generacija istoka" was released.  The book speaks in detail about the supporters group. The book itself doesn't have a publisher, can not be bought from a book store, and it was printed in 300 copies.

The group is known for the harsh and loud atmosphere they create on home venues, the state of the art Krešimir Ćosić Hall and run-down Stadion Stanovi. They have their own sections on those venues. 
In the old Jazine Basketball Hall they would be grouped mostly on the eastern stand.

The association doesn't have a direct political orientation, although they have sent some political messages; usually reflecting opinions of most inhabitants of Zadar.

The association is known for writing letters and press releases regarding their stand about the happenings in sport life in Croatia in general and in Zadar in particular.

Tornado Zadar was responsible for organizing fireworks show in 2011 for their basketball team KK Zadar a day before the big game to show their enormous support to their basketball team who was experiencing some bad luck on the play court. The city walls looked as if were "on fire".

Tornado Zadar in 2012 supported humanitarian aid aiming at collecting financial support for the war veterans surviving with €19 per month. The members gave financial support as well as support in material things like hygiene products 
In 2011 the association organized charity fundraising called "Let's help the family of Tihomir Purda". The aim of that humanitarian action was to financially help the family of the war veteran who was held in custody in Zenica on the basis of international arrest warrant issued by Serbian prosecution

References

Further reading
 Press release of the Tornado Zagreb regarding the arrests of the members of soccer "mafia"
 Article about graffiti known as Tornado wall
 Article about Tornado Zadar being banned from attending the game in 2012

External links 
 Official website
 Link to a blog about "Posljednja generacija istoka"
 Gallery of Tornado in Jazine Basketball Hall
 Film of Tornado Zadar on a match against KK Crvena Zvezda on YouTube
 Facebook account
 

KK Zadar
NK Zadar
Ultras groups
Sport in Zadar
Basketball in Croatia
Croatian football supporters' associations